Ferdinand Max Bredt (1860–1921) was a German Orientalist painter, noted for his studies of female figures.

Background

Also known as F. M. Bredt because of that signature on his work, he is regarded as one of Germany's leading Orientalist painters. Bredt was born in Leipzig, Germany in 1860, and originally trained as a book dealer. Transitioning to art, he studied first at the School of Art in Stuttgart, Germany, before continuing his studies in Munich, under Wilhelm Lindenschmit (the Younger). Bredt travelled extensively during his life, taking voyages to Greece, Italy, Turkey and Tunisia, producing an extensive body of work in oil and watercolor.

Bredt predominantly uses female subjects that he places in exotic locations, interiors, and courtyard. He was fascinated with Oriental architecture; he built his house and studio in Ruhpolding, Germany in an Arabian style.

The work of Bredt was exhibited in Paris, Berlin, Chicago and London. Today he is little-known, but he was widely recognized in his lifetime for his works. Two of his paintings were chosen to represent his native Germany at the World's Columbian Exposition of 1893.

See also
 List of German painters
 List of Orientalist artists

References

External links 
 

1868 births
1921 deaths
19th-century German painters
19th-century German male artists
German male painters
20th-century German painters
20th-century German male artists
Orientalist painters